Royal HaskoningDHV is an international, non-listed engineering consultancy firm with headquarters in Amersfoort, Netherlands. It has offices in 30 countries, employing 5,800 professionals worldwide.

Royal HaskoningDHV is active in aviation, buildings, energy, industry, infrastructure, maritime, mining, rural and urban development and water.

Financial history

History

Royal Haskoning

Johan van Hasselt taught civil engineering at the Royal Netherlands Military Academy in Breda for a year before starting his own engineering firm. Jacobus de Koning joined as a partner on October 15, 1881, and the engineering firm Hasselt & De Koning was established. The name of the firm changed quite a lot over the years. The name 'Haskoning' made its debut in the letterhead in the autumn of 1976. The acronym Haskoning started out as a telegram address. Reducing the length of the name was extremely practical because of the many international telegrams. In 1981 the company received the designation 'Royal' and one year later the legend changed to 'Koninklijk Ingenieurs- en Architectenbureau'. During the integration in 2001 the company name was changed to 'Royal Haskoning'.

DHV
Bastiaan Verhey had a well-paid job at the Navy Pilotage but his work ethic and entrepreneurial spirit made him desire for a life as a self-employed person. On 2 June 1916 he walked into Arnold Groothoff in The Hague, a classmate from Delft. Groothoff returned from the Dutch East Indies the other day. Intensive discussions followed and two weeks later they decided to start an advisory engineering company on 1 January 1917. Verhey is employed by the Navy until 1 December but Groothoff explored his relations, and soon the partners get to work, long before the official launch date. When in the autumn of 1916 it is apparent Groothoff will return to the West Indies, verhey approaches his acquaintance Adriaan Dwars. Both gentlemen come to an agreement in November 1916. At the same time, they are exploring a partnership with Arie Heederik, who has been leading bureau Schotel in Rotterdam for decades. The meetings are successful and even before the bureau Dwars, Groothoff and Verhey officially starts, they decided on a merger. This creates a new partnership on New Year's Day 1917: 'de Vereenigde Ingenieursbureaux voor Bouw- en Waterbouwkunde te Rotterdam en 's-Gravenhage'. In 1934 the company changes its name to 'Ingenieursbureau Dwars, Heederik en Verhey', abbreviated as 'DHV'.

Merger
In March 2012 both companies announced the intended merger. On 1 July 2012 the merger was official and Royal HaskoningDHV was established.

Projects 

 Canal del Dique
 Eko Atlantic
 Erasmus Hospital
 Fehmarn Belt Fixed Link
 Hong Kong–Zhuhai–Macau Bridge
 Hvidovre Hospital
 Maasvlakte 2
 Market Hall Rotterdam
 New international airport for Mexico City
 Nicaragua Canal
 One Angel Square
 Padstow Lifeboat Station
 Palm Jebel Ali
 Seine–Nord Europe Canal
 The World (archipelago)
 Vizhinjam International Seaport
 IKEA projects Saudi Arabia
 Beijing Daxing International Airport

References

External links

Dutch companies established in 2012
Engineering companies of the Netherlands
Companies based in Utrecht (province)
Privately held companies of the Netherlands